This list of museums in Devon, England, contains museums which are defined for this context as institutions (including nonprofit organizations, government entities, and private businesses) that collect and care for objects of cultural, artistic, scientific, or historical interest and make their collections or related exhibits available for public viewing. Also included are non-profit art galleries and university art galleries. Museums that exist only in cyberspace (i.e., virtual museums) are not included.

Museums

Defunct museums
 Barnstaple Heritage Centre, Barnstaple, closed in 2016
 Bradworthy Transport Museum, Holsworthy, website, closed in 2010
 High Cross House, Totnes, 1930s International Modernist style house with designed furniture and furnishings, paintings, sculptures and ceramics, built for the headmaster of Dartington Hall, closed in 2013
 Motoring Memories Museum, Colyford, closed in 2011
 Plymouth Dome, closed in 2006.
 Torrington 1646, Great Torrington, closed in 2015
 Yelverton Paperweight Centre, Yelverton

References

External links
 Devon Museums
 Guide to Devon Museums

See also
 Visitor attractions in Devon

 
Devon
Museums
Lists of listed buildings in Devon